Luigi Saidelli (born 12 January 1939) is an Italian former yacht racer who competed in the 1964 Summer Olympics.

References

1939 births
Living people
Italian male sailors (sport)
Olympic sailors of Italy
Sailors at the 1964 Summer Olympics – Star